The Slazenger Torquay Open was an indoor tennis tournament originally founded as the Palace Hotel Covered Courts in 1936 that was sponsored by the Dunlop Company for that year only. From the 1950s it was known as the Palace Hotel Covered Courts Championships, that ran until 1967. In 1968 the Scottish whisky company Dewars became sponsors of the event, and it was rebranded as the Dewar Cup Torquay until 1972 when sponsorship ended causing the 1973 edition not being held. In 1974 the sports company Slazenger took over sponsorship of the event until 1978 when it was abolished. It was at played at the Palace Hotel, Torquay, Devon, England.

History
The Palace Hotel Covered Courts tournament was founded in 1936, and was sponsored by the Dunlop Company for the first edition. It continued to be staged as an annual event under that name until 1959. In 1960 the tournament was rebranded as the Palace Hotel Covered Courts Championships through till 1967. In 1968 Dewar's then became sponsors of the Palace Hotel event, and it was rebranded as the Dewar Cup Torquay until 1972 when sponsorship ended causing the 1973 edition not being held. In 1974 Slazenger then took over sponsorship of the tournament and it was rebranced as the Slazenger Torquay Open. It was played on indoor courts at the Palace Hotel, Torquay, Devon, England

From 1968 to 1974 it was part of the fourth leg of Dewar Cup Circuit of indoor tournaments.

Finals

Men's singles

Women's singles

References

Sources
 Hedges, Martin (1978). The concise dictionary of tennis. New York: Mayflower Books. ISBN 0-86124-012-X.
 Nieuwland, Alex. "Tournament – Dewar Cup Fourth Leg – Torquay". www.tennisarchives.com. Netherlands: Tennis Archives.
 The New York Times. The New York Times Company.
 Wechsler, Bob (2008). Day by Day in Jewish Sports History. New York: KTAV Publishing House, Inc. ISBN 978-0-88125-969-8.
 WTA, ATP (2005). Official Guide to Professional Tennis 2005. New York: Sport Media Publishing. ISBN 978-1-894963-41-1.

Defunct tennis tournaments in the United Kingdom
Tennis tournaments in England
Indoor tennis tournaments